Abitibi County is a historical county in southwestern Quebec. Its county seat was in Amos. It extended from the Ontario border in the west to the Gouin Reservoir in the east, and included the communities of La Sarre and Val-d'Or in addition to Amos. It was bounded on the north by Abitibi Territory, on the east by Champlain County, on the west by the Ontario districts of Cochrane and Timiskaming and on the south by Témiscamingue County, Pontiac County, Montcalm County, Joliette County, Berthier County, Maskinongé County and St. Maurice County.

In the early 1980s Abitibi County was divided into Regional County Municipalities. The western panhandle section became Abitibi-Ouest MRC, the northcentral section went to Abitibi MRC, the eastcentral and southern sections went to Vallée-de-l'Or MRC, the farthest eastern section went to Le Haut-Saint-Maurice MRC (now La Tuque), and a small part in the southwest went to Rouyn-Noranda MRC (now Ville de Rouyn-Noranda).

Former counties of Quebec
Populated places disestablished in 1983

Yahoo!